The Bloomington Ferry Bridge is a  freeway bridge across the Minnesota River between Bloomington, Minnesota and Shakopee, Minnesota that carries U.S. Route 169 (US 169). The current bridge and the US 169 Shakopee Bypass were both completed in 1996. The bridge it replaced was designated Hennepin County Road 18 and Scott County Road 18.

Bridge history
In 1849, the Bloomington Ferry began operation across the Minnesota River, providing service until the first Bloomington Ferry Bridge was built in 1889 at the site of the current Bloomington Ferry Trail Bridge. This bridge remained in service until the late 1970s, when the bridge was replaced by a temporary 2-lane vehicle bridge. This second bridge remained in service until the third and current bridge was built approx.  upstream. This current bridge was built in 1996 to avoid the flooding issues that plagued the previous two bridges due to the road on the Scott County side of the bridge lying along the riverbank.

See also
 
 
 
 List of crossings of the Minnesota River

References

External links
Map: 

Road bridges in Minnesota
Bridges completed in 1889
Bridges completed in 1996
Bridges in Hennepin County, Minnesota
Buildings and structures in Scott County, Minnesota
Transportation in Scott County, Minnesota
U.S. Route 169
Bridges of the United States Numbered Highway System
Bridges over the Minnesota River
1889 establishments in Minnesota